Georges Lachat (2 August 1910 – 4 June 1992) was a French racing cyclist. He rode in the 1935 Tour de France.

References

External links
 

1910 births
1992 deaths
French male cyclists
Place of birth missing